Blueside is a South Korean video game developer and publisher located in Seoul, South Korea. It is mainly known for its popular game series Kingdom Under Fire.

Developed Titles
Xbox
 2004 - Kingdom Under Fire: The Crusaders (co-develop)
 2005 - Kingdom Under Fire: Heroes (co-develop)
Xbox 360
 2006 - Ninety-Nine Nights (co-develop)
 2007 - Kingdom Under Fire: Circle of Doom
PC
 Kingdom Under Fire II

References

External links
Blueside at Gamasutra
Blueside at IGN

Video game companies established in 2003
Video game development companies
Video game companies of South Korea
South Korean companies established in 2003
Companies based in Seoul